"How to Be Lonely" is a song by British singer Rita Ora, released as a single through Atlantic Records UK on 13 March 2020.

Composition
"How to Be Lonely" is a mid-tempo ballad that deals with themes about "battling insecurity".

Critical reception
Mike Wass of Idolator wrote that the song is a "nice way to kick off an era" that "does showcase the 'Anywhere' singer's powerful pipes and growth as an artist". Rob Copsey of the Official Charts Company wrote that the song features "opening guitar strums[,] Coldplay-sized chantalong chorus [and] catchy finger snaps, punchy electronic beats and some killer adlibs", concluding that Ora's "take on ugly crying powerhouse pop is masterfully done".

Music video
In the music video, Ora is in an empty room alone and then alone with a lot of people. An arrow hits her. In the next scene, she is walking in a room filled with eggshells. Then, she is dancing with a skeleton and a bear hugs her. After that, she falls into the sky. Then she smashes a wall with a baseball bat. A UFO lands.

Live performances 
Ora performed the song live at BBC's Sport Relief 2020 telethon on 13 March.

Track listings 

Digital download / streaming
"How to Be Lonely" – 2:55

Digital download / streaming - Live from London
"How to Be Lonely" (Live from London) – 2:56

Digital download / streaming - MÖWE Remix
"How to Be Lonely" (MÖWE Remix) – 2:54

Digital download / streaming - aboutagirl Remix
"How to Be Lonely" (aboutagirl Remix) – 3:23

Digital download / streaming - LARI LUKE Remix
"How to Be Lonely" (LARI LUKE Remix) – 3:21

Digital download / streaming - Sam Feldt Remix
"How to Be Lonely" (Sam Feldt Remix) – 3:11

Digital download / streaming - Bomba Estéreo Remix Remix
"How to Be Lonely" (Bomba Estéreo Remix) – 2:50

Personnel 
Credits adapted from Tidal.

Rita Ora - vocals
Lostboy – producer
Tom Mann - producer, background vocals, bass, drums, guitar, keyboard, programming, synthesizer, vocal production, writer
aboutagirl - producer
Siba - additional producer
Amanda Merdzan - assistant engineer

Matt Wolach - assistant mix engineer
Michael Freeman - assistant mix engineer
Lewis Capaldi - songwriter, background vocals, guitar
Mark "Spike" Stent - mastering, mixing
Stuart Hawkes - mastering
Cameron Gower Pool - vocal production
Peter Rycroft - writer

Charts

Release history 

 Ora is signed to Atlantic Records UK who distribute her music in the UK, Warner Records handle releases elsewhere in the world except several Asian countries licensed by Sony Music Entertainment Asia.

References

2020 songs
2020 singles
Rita Ora songs
Songs written by Lewis Capaldi
Atlantic Records UK singles
2020s ballads
Pop ballads
Music videos directed by Dave Meyers (director)
Songs written by Peter Rycroft